Aéro Club du Bas Armagnac (ACBA) is a large French aero club based in Nogaro, Armagnac. It offers a range of activities including pilot training and light aircraft hire. The club is noteworthy for having manufactured a glider tug of its own design, the ACBA Midour. Activities offered include gliding, aircraft, helicopter, and Autogyro.

References

External links

Club website (in French)

Bas Armagnac
Clubs and societies in France